Michael Alexander Sturridge (born 18 September 1962) is an English former footballer who played as a forward. Originally on the books of Birmingham City, he did not make a professional appearance for the club and only played a handful of games for Wrexham and Nuneaton Borough before retiring. He later became a youth football scout.

Playing career
Sturridge made four appearances in the English Football League whilst on loan from Birmingham City at Welsh club Wrexham. He later played for Nuneaton Borough in the 1986–87 season but was released after a few months by manager Jimmy Holmes.

Personal life
He is the father of England international forward Daniel Sturridge and the brother of former footballers Dean and Simon Sturridge.

References

1962 births
Living people
English footballers
Association football forwards
Birmingham City F.C. players
Wrexham A.F.C. players
English Football League players
Mike
Black British sportsmen
English people of Jamaican descent